Jason Lee Lydiate (born 29 October 1971) is an English former professional footballer. He is currently a coach with Rochdale.

Career
Born in Manchester, Lydiate who played as a right-back, began his career as a trainee with Alex Ferguson's Manchester United in 1990. After two years at Old Trafford, he joined Bolton Wanderers on a free transfer.

After averaging just ten league appearances per season for Wanderers in three seasons, in 1995 Lydiate was snapped up by Sam Allardyce at Blackpool for a fee of £75,000. He went on to make 87 appearances for the Seasiders in three years, before moving to the east coast to join Scarborough.

Towards the end of his stay at the McCain Stadium, Lydiate was loaned out to Rochdale. He was one of three players owed money by 'Boro upon their release from the club. A transfer embargo was placed on the club until the debts to the players were paid. He later joined Finn Harps on a short-term contract. In his only match for the club, he shot past his own keeper from outside the box. He later joined Hyde United in 2003, for whom he made 10 appearances.

Honours
Individual
Denzil Haroun Reserve Team Player of the Year: 1990–91

References

External links

Profile at PlayerHistory.com

1971 births
Living people
Footballers from Manchester
English footballers
Association football defenders
Manchester United F.C. players
Bolton Wanderers F.C. players
Blackpool F.C. players
Scarborough F.C. players
Rochdale A.F.C. players
Hyde United F.C. players
English Football League players
Rochdale A.F.C. non-playing staff
Finn Harps F.C. players
League of Ireland players